Prionotalis friesei is a moth in the family Crambidae. It was described by Stanisław Błeszyński in 1963. It is found in Ethiopia.

References

Crambinae
Moths described in 1963